Dart or DART may refer to:

 Dart, the equipment in the game of darts

Arts, entertainment and media
 Dart (comics), an Image Comics superhero
 Dart, a character from G.I. Joe
 Dart, a Thomas & Friends railway engine character
 Dart Feld, protagonist in the video game The Legend of Dragoon
Dart (poetry collection), a 2002 collection by British poet Alice Oswald

Businesses and organizations
 Dart (commercial vehicle), a former manufacturer of commercial vehicles in Iowa
 Dart Container, a US cup and container manufacturer incorporated in the Cayman Islands
 Dart Container Line, a shipping consortium that operated from 1969 to 1981
 Dart Drug, a former US drug-store chain
 Dart Group, a British airline and industrial holding company
 Dart Industries, a US drug-store group founded by Justin Whitlock Dart
 Dart Music, a digital music aggregator based in Tennessee
 Dart National Bank, a private bank in Michigan
 Direct Action and Research Training Center, a community organizing network in several states of the US
 Disaster Assistance and Rescue Team, a Singapore Civil Defence Force team
 Disaster Assistance Response Team, a Canadian Forces team

Places
 Cape Dart, a cape on Siple Island, Marie Byrd Land
 Dart Island, an island off the coast of Tasmania
 Dart River (disambiguation)

Science and technology

Biology 
 Love dart, an object created by hermaphroditic snails and slugs during courtship
 Dart, some moth species in the family Noctuidae
 Potanthus, a genus of skipper butterflies commonly known as darts

Computing
 Dart (programming language), a client-focused programming language from Google targeting multiple platforms
 Microsoft Diagnostics and Recovery Toolset (DaRT), a suite of diagnosis and recovery software
 Dynamic Analysis and Replanning Tool (DART), a U.S. military artificial intelligence program 
 DART for Publishers, now Google Ad Manager

Mathematics
 Dart, a concave kite in geometry

Space 
 DART (satellite), a former NASA spacecraft launched 2005
 Double Asteroid Redirection Test, a NASA space probe that intentionally impacted an asteroid in 2022

Technology
 DART radiative transfer model, a 3D radiative transfer model used in remote sensing
 Deep-ocean Assessment and Reporting of Tsunamis, a component of an enhanced tsunami warning system
 Direct analysis in real time (DART), an ion source used in mass spectrometry
 Diversity arrays technology (DArT), a technology used in molecular genetics

Transportation
 Dart (ship), a list of ships with the name Dart
 Dart, an 1863 South Devon Railway Eagle class locomotive
 Dart charge, the charging system for the Dartford Crossing of the River Thames near London

Aircraft
 Dart (rocketry), a free-flying top of a sounding rocket
 Dart Aircraft, a 1930s British aircraft manufacturer
 Culver Dart, a 1930s American light aircraft
 Blackburn Dart, a 1920s British biplane
 Paraavis Dart, a Russian paraglider
 Rolls-Royce Dart, a turboprop engine

Missiles and  weapons
 SSM-A-23 Dart, a 1950s American anti-tank missile
 Sea Dart, a modern British surface-to-air missile
 Dart gun (disambiguation)

Public transport
 Bucks County Transport DART, a bus transit system in Bucks County, Pennsylvania, US
 Dallas Area Rapid Transit, a Texas transit agency
 Dar Rapid Transit Agency, a bus rapid transit system in Dar es Salaam, Tanzania
 DART First State, a transit system in Delaware, US
 Des Moines Area Regional Transit, Iowa, US
 Dial-a-Ride Transit, a form of public transport in the UK
 Dixie Area Rapid Transit, the former name of SunTran in Utah, US
 Doncaster Area Rapid Transit, a section of SmartBus routes in Melbourne, Australia
 Dublin Area Rapid Transit, a railway network in Ireland
 Luton DART, a "people mover" system between Luton Airport and the Midland Main Line, in Luton, Bedfordshire, UK

Road vehicles
 Daimler Dart, a British sports car produced 1959–1964
 Dennis Dart, a bus chassis model
 Dodge Dart, an American car produced 1960–1976
 Dodge Dart (PF), an American car produced 2013–2016
 Goggomobil Dart, an Australian microcar produced 1959–1961

Other
 Dart (missile), a projectile weapon with pointed tip
 Dart (sewing), a fold sewn into the fabric of a garment
 Dart (surname) (people named Dart)

See also
 Darts (disambiguation)